Daniel Aloysius Riley (11 May 1916 – 13 September 1984) was a Canadian politician.

Early life
Born in Charlottetown, Prince Edward Island, he received a Bachelor of Civil Law degree from the University of New Brunswick in 1940.

Career
In 1949, he was elected to the House of Commons of Canada for the New Brunswick riding of St. John—Albert. A Liberal, he was defeated in the 1953 election and again in the 1957 election.

In 1963, he was elected to the Legislative Assembly of New Brunswick and was the Liberal Minister of Lands and Forests in the Louis Robichaud cabinet. He resigned in 1966 and was appointed chairman of the New Brunswick Motor Carrier Board and Public Utilities Commission. He was summoned to the Senate of Canada in 1973 representing the senatorial division of Saint John, New Brunswick.

Death
He served until his death in 1984.

References

External links
 

1916 births
1984 deaths
Canadian senators from New Brunswick
Liberal Party of Canada MPs
New Brunswick Liberal Association MLAs
Members of the House of Commons of Canada from New Brunswick
People from Charlottetown
University of New Brunswick alumni